Roberto Porfírio Maximiano Rodrigo (born 28 November 1988), known simply as Roberto, is a Portuguese professional footballer who plays as a forward for F.C. Penafiel.

Mainly associated with Arouca whom he represented in three spells, he played 88 Primeira Liga matches and scored 18 goals, also for Moreirense. In LigaPro, he surpassed 150 games and 50 goals in service of four teams.

Club career
Born in Porto, Roberto arrived at FC Porto at the age of 16 and made one half-hour substitute appearance for their reserves in the third division on 7 May 2006, a goalless draw against S.C. Espinho. He carried on playing no higher than that level, for several clubs. After a breakthrough 2010–11 in which he scored 19 goals for F.C. Tirsense, he signed a four-year deal with Associação Naval 1º de Maio of the Segunda Liga.

After terminating his contract with Naval due to lack of payment at the end of 2012, Roberto moved across the second tier the following January to join F.C. Arouca. He contributed three goals in 11 matches as they earned a first-ever promotion to the Primeira Liga as runners-up to C.F. Os Belenenses, followed by six more in the top flight.

In July 2014, Roberto moved abroad to FC Tosno in the Russian First Division but did not play, returning a month later to Arouca on a three-year deal. He contributed six goals as the team stayed up again, including two in a 3–3 home draw to C.D. Nacional on 8 February 2015.

Roberto was loaned to fellow top-division club Moreirense F.C. in July 2016. He played four games as they won the Taça da Liga for the first time in their history, netting twice on 29 December in a 3–3 home draw against Belenenses in the group stage.

In the summer of 2017, Roberto moved abroad again to U.S. Salernitana 1919 of Italy's Serie B but again returned immediately to Arouca, this time on loan. He scored nine times in this spell, including a brace on 17 February 2018 in a 3–1 away victory over S.C. Braga B.

Roberto cut ties with Salernitana after his year in Arouca, signing a two-year contract with second-tier G.D. Estoril Praia on 1 July 2018. His first season as a Canary was the most prolific of his professional career with 13 goals in 26 games, fourth best in the league. He followed this with 12 in 22 in his second year, including a first professional hat-trick on 3 November 2019 in a 3–1 home defeat of Académico de Viseu FC.

On 7 July 2020, Roberto agreed to a one-year deal at G.D. Chaves.

Honours
Moreirense
Taça da Liga: 2016–17

References

External links

1988 births
Living people
Portuguese footballers
Footballers from Porto
Association football forwards
Primeira Liga players
Liga Portugal 2 players
Segunda Divisão players
FC Porto B players
CD Operário players
F.C. Tirsense players
Associação Naval 1º de Maio players
F.C. Arouca players
Moreirense F.C. players
G.D. Estoril Praia players
G.D. Chaves players
F.C. Penafiel players
FC Tosno players
U.S. Salernitana 1919 players
Portuguese expatriate footballers
Expatriate footballers in Russia
Expatriate footballers in Italy
Portuguese expatriate sportspeople in Russia
Portuguese expatriate sportspeople in Italy